FC Emmen started in the Eredivisie for the first time in its 34 years of existence. Immediately after FC Emmen had enforced the promotion, the whole of Drenthe embraced the red and white. The selection of the previous season was largely retained so that the group could draw strength from the euphoria which brought the promotion and started the 2018/2019 season in good spirits. For to the outside world, there was only one outcome imaginable: the "camping team" could go directly avoid relegation. The proud residents of Drenthe who managed to get a season ticket were sure: it would not be over after just one round of the Eredivisie. In the season opener in The Hague, FC Emmen surprised friend and foe by beating ADO 1–2. FC Emmen managed to fight itself out of the danger zone by trial and error and sprinted in the final piece of the competition with 4 wins in the last 6 matches to no less than 38 points and took the 14th position in the final ranking. In Tilburg, the party erupted when direct enforcement against Willem II was secured. Thousands of supporters waited for the selection at De Oude Meerdijk to celebrate the success. A few days later FC Groningen came to Emmen for the final of the 2018/2019 season. The spontaneous ceremony had no negative impact on the performance of the only professional club from Drenthe. With a 1–0 win, FC Emmen sent FC Groningen without points return on the Hunebed Highway. With no less than 6 points from the Hondsrug derby, FC Emmen to finish her debut year in the Eredivisie as Champion of the North. In the 35th season of its existence, FC Emmen could once again prepare for a season in the Eredivisie.

Eredivisie

League table

References

FC Emmen
FC Emmen seasons